The Pacific royal flycatcher (Onychorhynchus occidentalis) is a species of passerine bird in the family Tityridae according to the International Ornithological Committee (IOC). It is found in western Ecuador and northwestern Peru.

Taxonomy and systematics

The IOC considers the Pacific royal flycatcher and three other royal flycatcher taxa to be separate species and places them in the family Tityridae. The South American Classification Committee of the American Ornithological Society (SACC-AOS) and the Clements taxonomy consider the four to be subspecies of the widespread royal flycatcher (Onychorhynchus coronatus sensu lato). SACC-AOS places O. coronatus in family Onychorhynchidae and includes four other flycatcher species in that family. Clements places it in family Oxyruncidae and includes those four, one other flycatcher, and the sharpbill. IOC considers all of them to be in Tityridae. 

The Pacific royal flycatcher is monotypic.

Description

The species is bright tawny brown above and yellow-orange below. The rump and tail are buffy cinnamon. The bill is long and broad. It has an erectile fan-shaped crest that is red in the male and yellow in the female.

Distribution and habitat

The Pacific royal flycatcher is found in western Ecuador discontinuously from Esmeraldas Province to El Oro Province and slightly into Peru's Department of Tumbes. It inhabits humid lowlands, both primary evergreen and second growth forests. It is a bird of the midstory, often along streams.

Behavior

Feeding

All of the royal flycatchers are insectivorous.

Breeding

A Pacific royal flycatcher's active nest was found in Ecuador in January. The nest is long and narrow and is suspended from a branch or vine, usually above water. The clutch is two eggs; only the female incubates them and broods and feeds the nestlings.

Vocalization

The Pacific royal flycatcher is usually inconspicuous and quiet. Its song is  "a descending, slowing series of plaintive whistles"  and its call a repeated "keeeyup or keee-yew" .

Status

The IUCN has assessed the Pacific royal flycatcher as being Vulnerable. "Rapid rates of deforestation have reduced this species's now small and severely fragmented range and population."

References

Pacific royal flycatcher
Birds of Ecuador
Pacific royal flycatcher
Pacific royal flycatcher
Taxonomy articles created by Polbot